Romsley  is a civil parish in Shropshire, England.  It contains three listed buildings that are recorded in the National Heritage List for England.  All the listed buildings are designated at Grade II, the lowest of the three grades, which is applied to "buildings of national importance and special interest".  The parish is almost completely rural with a few small scattered settlements, and the listed buildings are all houses dating from the 16th and 17th centuries.


Buildings

References

Citations

Sources

Lists of buildings and structures in Shropshire